This is a list of castles in Ukraine.

A
 Akkerman Fortress in Bilhorod-Dnistrovskyi, Odesa Oblast

B
 Bar Castle in Bar, Vinnytsia Oblast
 Berdychiv Castle in Berdychiv, Zhytomyr Oblast
 Berezhany Castle in Berezhany, Ternopil Oblast
 Brody Castle in Brody, Lviv Oblast
 The ruined Bronka Castle in Bronka, Zakarpattia Oblast
 Buchach Castle in Buchach, Ternopil Oblast

C
 The ruined Chervonohorod Castle in Nyrkiv, Ternopil Oblast
 Chembalo fortress in Balaklava, Crimea
Cherkasy Castle
 The ruined Chernelytsia Castle in Chernelytsia, Ivano-Frankivsk Oblast
 Chufut Kale fortress near Bakhchisaray, Crimea

D
 Dobromyl Castle in Dobromyl, Lviv Oblast
 Dubno Castle in Dubno, Rivne Oblast

G
 The Genoese fortress in Sudak, Crimea

H
 Halych Castle in Halych, Ivano-Frankivsk Oblast

I
 Ivano-Frankivsk Castle in Ivano-Frankivsk, Ivano-Frankivsk Oblast
 Iziaslav Castle in northern Khmelnytskyi Oblast

K
 Kamianets-Podilskyi Castle in Kamianets-Podilskyi, Khmelnytsky Oblast
 The ruined Genoese Kaffa fortress in Feodosiya, Crimea
 Khotyn Fortress in Khotyn, Chernivtsi Oblast
 The ruins of Khust Castle in Khust, Zakarpattia Oblast
 Kilia Castle in Kilia, Odesa Oblast
 Kremenets Castle in Kremenets, Ternopil Oblast
 Kodak fortress in Dnipro, Dnipropetrovsk Oblast
 Kudryntsi Castle in Kudryntsi, Ternopil Oblast
 Kyiv Fortress in Kyiv, Kyiv Oblast

L
 Letychiv Castle in Letychiv, Khmelnytskyi Oblast
 Lviv High Castle in Lviv, Lviv Oblast
 Lutsk Castle in Lutsk, Volyn Oblast

M
 Medzhybizh Castle in Medzhybizh
 Mangup, its ruins are near Sevastopol
 Mykulyntsi Castle in Mykulyntsi, Ternopil Oblast

N
 Nevytsky Castle in Nevytske, Zakarpattia Oblast
 Nizhyn Castle in Nizhyn, Chernihiv Oblast

O
 Olesko Castle, about 75 km from Lviv, Lviv Oblast
 Olyka Castle
 Ostroh Castle in Ostroh, Rivne Oblast

P
 Palanok Castle in Mukacheve, Zakarpattia Oblast
 Pidhirtsi Castle 
 Pomoriany Castle, Lviv Oblast
 Popov Castle in Vasylivka, Zaporizhzhia Oblast

S
 Schönborn Palace in Chynadiyovo, Zakarpattia Oblast
 Skala-Podilska Castle in Skala-Podilska, Ternopil Oblast
 Skalat Castle in Skalat, Ternopil Oblast
 Stare Selo Castle in Lviv Oblast
 Svirzh Castle in Svirzh, Lviv Oblast
 Sydoriv Castle in Sydoriv, Ternopil Oblast
 Swallow's Nest Castle in Crimea

T
 Terebovlia Castle in Terebovlia, Ternopil Oblast
 Ternopil Castle in Ternopil
 The ruins of Toky Castle in Toky, Ternopil Oblast
 Tyhoml Castle in Khmelnytskyi Oblast

U
 Uzhhorod Castle in Uzhhorod, Zakarpattia Oblast

V
 Velyki Birky Castle in Velyki Birky, Ternopil Oblast
 Vynohradiv Castle in Vynohradiv, Zakarpattia Oblast

Y
 Yazlovets Castle in Yazlovets, Ternopil Oblast
 Yeni-Kale Fortress in Kerch, Crimea

Z
 Zbarazh Castle in Zbarazh, Ternopil Oblast
 Zhovkva Castle in Zhovkva, Lviv Oblast
 Zolochiv Castle in Zolochiv, Lviv Oblast
 Zolotyi Potik Castle in Zolotyi Potik, Ternopil Oblast

See also
 List of castles
 Castles and Fortresses of Western Ukraine

References

External links
 castles.com.ua — Site dedicated to castles in Ukraine
 castles.org — Castles of Ukraine
 Wumag — Castles and chateaux of Ukraine
 

 
Ukraine
Castles
Castles
Ukraine